Mark Brisker (born September 22, 1969) is an American-Israeli 1.96 m (6 ft 5 in) tall former basketball guard.

He was born in Detroit, Michigan.  At Henry Ford High School, in 1987 he was a second-team Class A All-State pick by the Free Press.  He played college basketball for Polk Community College and Stetson University.

He played for a number of professional teams, including Maccabi Tel Aviv of the Israeli Super League.

His son, born in 1998, is Israeli basketball player Michael Brisker.

References

External links
 Euroleague profile
 Eurobasket.com profile

1969 births
Living people
Basketball players from Detroit
Central Michigan Chippewas men's basketball players
Hapoel Galil Elyon players
Hapoel Jerusalem B.C. players
Ionikos N.F. B.C. players
Ironi Ramat Gan players
Israeli American
Israeli men's basketball players
Junior college men's basketball players in the United States
Maccabi Ra'anana players
Maccabi Tel Aviv B.C. players
Polk State College alumni
Quad City Thunder players
Shooting guards
Henry Ford High School (Detroit, Michigan) alumni
Stetson Hatters men's basketball players
American men's basketball players
United States Basketball League players